The Communauté d'agglomération du Pays de Saint-Malo (also: Saint-Malo Agglomération) is the communauté d'agglomération, an intercommunal structure, centred on the city of Saint-Malo. It is located in the Ille-et-Vilaine department, in the Brittany region, western France. It was created in January 2001. Its seat is Cancale. Its area is 245.5 km2. Its population was 83,853 in 2014, of which 46,478 in Saint-Malo proper.

Composition
The communauté d'agglomération consists of the following 18 communes:

Cancale  
Châteauneuf-d'Ille-et-Vilaine  
La Fresnais  
La Gouesnière  
Hirel  
Lillemer  
Miniac-Morvan 
Plerguer 
Saint-Benoît-des-Ondes  
Saint-Coulomb  
Saint-Guinoux 
Saint-Jouan-des-Guérets  
Saint-Malo 
Saint-Méloir-des-Ondes  
Saint-Père-Marc-en-Poulet 
Saint-Suliac
Le Tronchet  
La Ville-ès-Nonais

References

Saint-Malo
Saint-Malo